Pir Aquam (also Romanized as Pīr Aqūām and Pīr Aqowām; also known as Pīr Aqūn) is a village in Sharqi Rural District, in the Central District of Ardabil County, Ardabil Province, Iran. At the 2006 census, its population was 1,569, in 307 families.

References 

Towns and villages in Ardabil County